Jan Martínez Franchi (born 28 January 1998) is an Argentine professional volleyball player. He is a member of the Argentina national team. At the professional club level, he plays for Trefl Gdańsk.

Honours

Clubs
 National championships
 2017/2018  Argentine Cup, with Ciudad Vóley
 2018/2019  Argentine Championship, with Bolívar Vóley
 2020/2021  Belgian Championship, with Greenyard Maaseik

Youth national team
 2015  FIVB U19 World Championship
 2016  CSV U21 South American Championship
 2016  U23 Pan American Cup
 2017  FIVB U23 World Championship

Individual awards
 2015: FIVB U19 World Championship – Best Outside Spiker
 2016: CSV U21 South American Championship – Most Valuable Player

References

External links
 
 Player profile at PlusLiga.pl 
 Player profile at Volleybox.net

1998 births
Living people
Volleyball players from Buenos Aires
Argentine men's volleyball players
Medalists at the 2019 Pan American Games
Volleyball players at the 2019 Pan American Games
Pan American Games gold medalists for Argentina
Pan American Games medalists in volleyball
Argentine expatriate sportspeople in Brazil
Expatriate volleyball players in Brazil
Argentine expatriate sportspeople in Belgium
Expatriate volleyball players in Belgium
Argentine expatriate sportspeople in Poland
Expatriate volleyball players in Poland
Trefl Gdańsk players
Outside hitters
Liberos